The 56th Norwegian Biathlon Championships were held in Voss, Hordaland, Norway from 25 March to 30 March 2014 at the stadium Voss ski- og tursenter, arranged by Voss SSL. There were a total of 8 scheduled competitions: individual, sprint, mass start and relay races for men and women. The stadium had been fitted with new electronic targets. The targets were made from rubber rather than the conventional metal. Based on the sound made when the bullet hit the target, the computer system calculated exactly where the bullet hit. The targets were produced by Megalink AS.

Ole Einar Bjørndalen did not participate in any races due to fever, but still appeared at the stadium during the championships, mingling with the fans and even commentating the men's mass start for the Norwegian Broadcasting Corporation. Emil Hegle Svendsen and Tarjei Bø also missed the races due to illness.

Schedule
All times are local (UTC+1).

Medal winners

Men

Women

References

External links
  

Norwegian Biathlon Championships
2014 in biathlon
2014 in Norwegian sport